Katherine Fitzgerald (c.1452-1506) was an  Anglo-Irish Noblewoman of the Geraldine's dynasty, during the 15th century. At the time of her birth, her family was one of the most influential houses in Ireland. By her husband, her married name was Mac Carthaigh Riabhach and she became the princess of Carbery from 1477 to 1506.

For her own pleasure, she erected two castles.

Family
Katherine was probably born in 1452, in one of the Fitzgerald castles.
Katherine was the eldest of their daughters and the third child of the 7th Earl of Desmond by his wife. 
Her father, Thomas FitzGerald, one of the most powerful men in Ireland, was Viceroy of Ireland in the reign of Edward IV; after being the victim of the malice of the Queen, 
Elizabeth Woodville, having made an unfortunate speech in reference to her low birth, he was executed at Drogheda, on 15 February 1468.
Her mother, Ellice Barry, secondly married Maurice 'Mor' FitzGibbon, 6th White Knight. She mothered Sir John FitzGibbon who held the office of Lord Justice of Ireland and Maurice 'Oge' Fitzgibbon, 7th White Knight (d.1530).
She had seven brothers and one sister, four of which acceded to the Earldom of Desmond:
James FitzThomas FitzGerald. c.1449-1487, probably murdered by his brother, John.
Maurice FitzThomas FitzGerald. c.1450-1520.
Thomas FitzThomas FitzGerald. 1454-1534.
Unnamed boy #1, c.1456-1468 who was murdered by John Tiptoft, 1st Earl of Worcester.
Unnamed boy #2, c.1458-1468 who was murdered by John Tiptoft, 1st Earl of Worcester.
John FitzGerald, de facto 12th Earl of Desmond, c.1460-1536 whose male descendants were extinct in 1632.
Ellen Fitzgerald , c.1462 who married Tagd O’Brien of Killaloe.
Gerald Oge Fitzgerald, c.1464 whose male descendants were extinct in 1743.

Character

The Annals of the Kingdom of Ireland by the Four Masters described her as "a charitable and truly hospitable woman". It is also mentioned her liking for castles and military strategy that a probable fosterage in McCarthy Muskerry's household may have favoured.

Marriage

Probably between her fifteenth and twentieth years, between 1467 and 1472, after obtaining a plausible papal dispensation because her husband's sister married her maternal uncle, Katherine became Finghin MacCarthy Reagh's wife, who was her maternal uncle-by-marriage. She mothered four sons and one daughter: 
Donal MacFineere MacCarthy Reagh, 9th Prince of Carbery;
Donogh MacFineere MacCarthy Reagh;
Dermod MacFineere MacCarthy Reagh;
Cormac MacFineere MacCarthy Reagh,
Ellen MacCarthy Reagh, married to James de Barry, Lord of Ibane.

Lady of Hy-Carbery

By her husband, her married name was MacCarthaigh Riabhach and she became the princess of Carbery from 1477 to 1506. Through her Native Irish marriage, Katherine could bring her own moveable property to her marriage. And she could acquire more, often spending it without her husband's permission and reclaim it on her widowhood.

Builder of castles 

Benduff Castle, was built by Katherine Fitzgerald, in 1470, probably before her marriage to Finghin MacCarthy Regh. It passed on to Carbery's ruling family on Katherine's marriage. After the rebellion of 1641, the MacCarthy Reagh were dispossessed and the castle fell into the hands of a Quaker by the name of Apollo Morris.

This beautiful Castle is situated about a mile to the northeast of Rosscarbery (Co. Cork), in the bosom of a secluded valley shut in by hills and at one time by a dense plantation of trees. It thus differed from the generality of the feudal strongholds which were either perched on a rocky eminence or surmounted the summit of some rising ground. But the sheltered and isolated position of this castle probably protected it from external danger.

Originally a strong structure, Benduff Castle was built in the usual style of the Norman fortresses which studded Ireland during the Middle Ages, distinguished for their square central keep or tower, with thick massive walls and loopholes for the use of arms as well as the admission of light, to which were generally attached side buildings furnished with bastions, and strong outer walls enclosing the entire foundation — these latter being sometimes provided with covered ways. Benduff Castle has three internal arches; its walls 11 feet thick, with passages and recesses, and the usual stone stairway. It was originally about 70 feet high till old William Morris took the top off, and put on it a slated roof.

Dun-na-m-beann is a fort, near Dunmanway, a town twelve miles west of Bandon (Co. Cork). Dr. Smith gives no account of the erection of this castle in its Natural and Civil History of Cork, where he treats with the origins of the city. This castle belonged to the clan of MacCarthy Gleannacroim, until about the year 1690, when it was forfeited due to the family supporting the Jacobite cause in the Williamite War in Ireland.

Book of Lismore 

Like her father, she supported Irish literature and music.

Leabhar Mhic Cárthaigh Riabhaigh was probably compiled to commemorate the marriage of Finghin MacCarthy Reagh to Katherine, daughter of the 7th Earl of Desmond. The book was written in Irish, but no Irish version of spoken today. The book contains several important texts, including the new Ever-Tongue, a cosmological work, with a very important to the lives of saints including St. Bridget, St. Patrick and St. Columba, a translation of the travels of Marco Polo and one of the greatest compositions of the Fenian Cycle, the Acallam na Senórach or the Conversation Old Man. Everything is embellished with illuminations.
The Book of Lismore was discovered in a wall of the castle of Lismore, in 1811.

Her death 

The Annals of the Four Masters say that Katherine died in 1506 at 54 of the age, one year after the death of her husband. Her eldest son, Donnell, seized the throne of Hy-Carbery after his uncle's death, some time before Katherine was dead.

"M1506.14: Catherine, daughter of Earl of Desmond, that is to say, Thomas, son of James, Lady of Hy-Carbury, a charitable and truly hospitable woman, died."

Notes

References 

Annals of the Kingdom of Ireland by the Four Masters : Volume 5, p. 1289.
Completed peerage of Cockayne ; Volume III, p. 85.
The Execution of the Earl of Desmond, Essays & Articles, Richard III Society, by John Ashdown-Hill and Annette Carson. 2005, p. 5.
The Illustrated Guide of The Blackwater and Ardmore,  by William Spencer, Sixth Duke of Devonshire. 1898, p. 35.

External links 
(en) Pedrigree of Katherine Fitzgerald, Lady of Hy-Carbery.
(en) Builder of Benduff Castle.
(en) Irish Pedigrees: MacCarthy Reagh, Prince of Carbery (#118).
(en) Castle Salem.

1452 births
1506 deaths
FitzGerald dynasty
15th-century Irish people
15th-century Irish women
Daughters of Irish earls